Jean Liedloff (November 26, 1926 – March 15, 2011) was an American author, born in New York City, and best known for her 1975 book The Continuum Concept.  She is the aunt of writer Janet Hobhouse, and is represented by the character Constance in Hobhouse's book "The Furies."

Born in New York City in 1926, as a teenager she attended the Drew Seminary for Young Women and began studying at Cornell University, but began her expeditions before she could graduate.

During a diamond-hunting expedition to Venezuela, she came into contact with an indigenous people named the Yequana. Over time she became fascinated with the Yequana, and made a decision to return to Venezuela to live with them. She wrote her book, The Continuum Concept, to describe her new understanding of how we have lost much of our natural well-being, and to show us practical ways to regain it for our children and for ourselves. Her book is based on her experiences while living with the Yequana, and discusses in particular their style of child-rearing and its fundamental effect on their later lives.

She was a founding member of The Ecologist magazine.

Liedloff died on March 15, 2011, in Sausalito, California.

Bibliography
 The Continuum Concept: In Search of Happiness Lost 
 Jungle Jean biography by Geralyn Gendreau  (2021)
 When Good Enough Isn't, Mother Blame in The Continuum Concept, Journal of the Association for Research on Mothering, 6(2) by Chris Bobel (2004)
 The Continuum Concept, A Personal Experience Self & Society, An International Journal for Humanistic Psychology 18(4) by Peter Ellis (1990)

See also
 Baby sling

References

External links

Photo Album
Interview with her by Chris Mercogliano
Video interview with her by Michael Mendizza, direct link to the video
Jean Liedloff on the role of golf in the Western lifestyle
Interview With Jean Liedloff, November 16th 2004, in English
Interview With Jean Liedloff, November 16th 2004, in Hebrew

1926 births
2011 deaths
American magazine editors
20th-century American women writers
20th-century American non-fiction writers
Writers from New York City
American women non-fiction writers
Women magazine editors
21st-century American women